is a Japanese football player. He plays for Thespakusatsu Gunma.

Career
Tomoyuki Shiraishi joined Japan Football League club Azul Claro Numazu in 2016.

Club statistics
Updated to 22 February 2018.

References

External links

Profile at Grulla Morioka

1993 births
Living people
Hosei University alumni
Association football people from Gunma Prefecture
Japanese footballers
Japan Football League players
J2 League players
J3 League players
Azul Claro Numazu players
Iwate Grulla Morioka players
Kataller Toyama players
Thespakusatsu Gunma players
Association football midfielders